The Niagara IceDogs are a major junior ice hockey team in the Ontario Hockey League based in St. Catharines, Ontario, Canada. The franchise was originally known as the Mississauga IceDogs and founded in 1996. The team was relocated to St. Catharines and played its inaugural season in the Niagara region during the 2007–08 OHL season after nine seasons in Mississauga. In 2022 the team was acquired by majority owner Darren DeDobbelaer and minority owner Wayne Gretzky.

History

Early years, 1998-2007
The Mississauga IceDogs inaugural season began in 1998–99, and the team struggled, winning only 4 of 68 games. In their first three seasons, the IceDogs won a total of 16 games, in 204 games played.
The nine season tenure in Mississauga saw the IceDogs finish with a .301 win percentage in 612 regular season games and win one Central Division and Eastern Conference Championship.

Relocation
On July 12, 2006, Eugene Melnyk, who owned the Toronto St. Michael's Majors, bought the Mississauga IceDogs. After the 2006–07 season, Melnyk sold the IceDogs, and moved the Majors to the Hershey Centre in Mississauga. The team approached the City of St. Catharines about moving the team into Jack Gatecliff Arena. St. Catharines City Council voted on a leasing arrangement on April 23, 2007, which passed. The OHL Board of Governors approved the deal on June 5, 2007.

Jack Gatecliff Arena era
The Niagara IceDogs spent their first seven seasons in St. Catharines in the Jack Gatecliff arena. In six of the seven years at the Jack Gatecliff arena, the IceDogs led the OHL as the best attended team based on capacity percentage. During this time, the IceDogs qualified for the playoffs in every year, making it to the Eastern Conference finals twice. The IceDogs most successful year was in 2011–12 when they won both the Emms Trophy and Bobby Orr Trophy as Central Division and Eastern Conference Champions. They would ultimately fall in the finals, however, to the London Knights in five games. While playing at the Jack Gatecliff arena, Niagara's line-ups featured a number of eventual high NHL draft picks and NHL alumni. First round draft picks included Alex Pietrangelo, Mark Visentin, Ryan Strome, Dougie Hamilton and Brendan Perlini. Other notable players to play for the IceDogs at the Jack Gatecliff are Stefan Legein, Luca Caputi, Andrew Agozzino, Brett Ritchie, Jamie Oleksiak, Freddie Hamilton and Andrew Shaw, who was the first Niagara IceDogs alumnus to win the Stanley Cup.

Meridian Centre era
The IceDogs entered a new era when they relocated to the brand new Meridian Centre in St. Catharines. On October 16, 2014, the IceDogs won their first game at the Meridian Centre by a score of 7–4 against the visiting Belleville Bulls. The first goal at the new Meridian Centre was scored by Mikkel Aagaard from Denmark. While the arena's initial season saw the IceDogs go down in five games in the second round to the eventual Memorial Cup champions Oshawa Generals, the organization went all in during the 2015–16 season. While adding key veteran acquisitions as the season went on, including star goaltender Alex Nedeljkovic, a second round pick of the Carolina Hurricanes, the IceDogs once again battled their way to the OHL Finals. Niagara went on to face the London Knights, a rematch of the 2012 OHL Finals, but once again came up short, losing the series in four games. With the organization facing a rebuild after a disappointing finish to the season, the IceDogs parted ways with head coach and general manager Marty Williamson, commencing a new era for the organization after six seasons that featured two conference championships, one division championship, and six consecutive years of playoffs. 

The next season saw the IceDogs go into rebuild mode, with younger key future players beginning to make the jump, like Akil Thomas, as most of the vets had moved on, aged out, or had been traded around the trade deadline for picks and prospects. They made the playoffs that year, and lost to the Peterborough Petes in the first round in 4 games. The 2017–2018 season saw them become more competitive, and around the trade deadline added some depth pieces to ensure they could be more competitive than last season's playoffs. They beat the Oshawa Generals in the first round in 5 games, and then faced off against a very good Hamilton Bulldogs team. Despite taking 3 games to overtime, they lost in 5 games. 

The 2018–2019 season saw the team go all in. Along with the returning vets from last season, they acquired the likes of (eventual CHL Leading Scorer and Eddie Powers Memorial Trophy recipient) Jay Robertson, Jack Studnicka, and depth pieces like Ivan Lodnia, Jason Paquette, and Matt Brassard. The team also saw the rise of sophomore forward Philip Tomasino. The team would finish first in the OHL Central division, winning the Emms Trophy. In the playoffs, they beat the North Bay Battalion in 5 games. In the second round, they faced the Oshawa Generals. Despite going up 2–0, they proceeded to lose 4 straight ending their season. Stephen Dhillon became the winningest goalie in IceDogs history, setting a franchise record for wins in a season (38), and total wins for his time as an IceDog (98). The IceDogs finished the season with the most goals scored in the league, and in franchise history (326). 

In March 2019, the OHL fined the IceDogs $250,000 and two first round draft picks for giving secret side deals to players to pay them above the OHL maximum allowed in the Standard Player Agreement. This was reduced via settlement to $150,000, its 2021 first round draft pick, and an admission that the IceDogs violated the league's player recruitment rules. The OHL had launched an investigation into the IceDogs after receiving complaints from a former player that $40,000 of orally agreed upon payments were not made by the team. Led by Toronto law firm,  Lax O’Sullivan Lisus Gottlieb LLP, the report confirmed that the IceDogs made rulebreaking deals to two players and likely had more secret deals with its European players. 

The 2019–2020 season saw the team go into rebuild mode once again, losing key players to the NHL or simply age out of the league. At the trade deadline they traded Captain and star forward Akil Thomas and other star forward Philip Tomasino for the purposes of restocking their draft cupboard, which had been depleted the season prior. They would then name Ivan Lodnia captain for the rest of the season. The team had a scary moment when rising young goalie Tucker Tynan was involved in a freak incident during a game against the London Knights, taking a major cut to the thigh when a London Knights player drove into the net and crashed into him. The incident made headlines across Canada and the hockey community. The COVID-19 pandemic would then hit and cause the subsequent cancellation of the rest of the CHL season and then playoffs. The team finished in second last place, and chose 2nd overall in the 2020 OHL draft, where they drafted forward Pano Fimis.

2022 OHL investigation and fallout
Following an investigation, OHL commissioner David Branch suspended both the team's general manager Joey Burke and head coach Billy Burke indefinitely, after it was revealed the two made inappropriate comments about a female colleague via WhatsApp. The brothers, along with the IceDogs organization were fined $150,000 CDN in regards to the incident. The brothers who also serve as minority owners are eligible to apply for reinstatement on June 1, 2024.

Months after the investigation, Bill and Denise Burke sold the team to Darren DeDobbelaer, who became the majority owner, alongside Wayne Gretzky.

Championships

Emms TrophyCentral Division Championship
 2011–12
 2018–19

Bobby Orr TrophyEastern Conference Championship
 2011–12
 2015–16

J. Ross Robertson CupOntario Hockey League Championship
 2011–12 : Lost to London Knights
 2015–16 : Lost to London Knights

Coaches
Mario Cicchillo was promoted from assistant coach in 2006–07 for Mississauga and became the first coach of the Niagara IceDogs after it was announced that head coach Mike Kelly resigned to accept a senior advisory position with the team. In August 2009, Cicchillo was fired and assistant coach Mike McCourt was named interim head coach.  In early May 2010, the IceDogs announced that the team would not be renewing the contracts of McCourt and his assistants. Former Barrie Colts coach/general manager Marty Williamson was named coach and general manager of the IceDogs in late May 2010. With a rebuild about to begin, the IceDogs decided to part ways with Williamson in 2016 after six successful years and promoted assistant Dave Bell to head coach. In the summer of 2017, Bell left the organization after just one year as head coach to join the Ontario Reign of the American Hockey League. Billy Burke served as the head coach from 2017, until his suspension in April 2022. Daniel Fitzgerald was named head coach in July 2022.

 2007–2009 Mario Cicchillo
 2009–2010 Mike McCourt (interim)
 2010–2016 Marty Williamson
 2016–2017 Dave Bell
 2017–2022 Billy Burke
 2022 Jody Hull (interim)
 2022 Daniel Fitzgerald
 2022 Jeff Angelidis (interim)
 2022–present Ryan Kuwabara

Players

NHL alumni

 Andrew Agozzino
 Darren Archibald
 Luca Caputi
 Matt Corrente
 Vince Dunn
 Alex Friesen
 Dougie Hamilton
 Freddie Hamilton
 Josh Ho-Sang
 Ben Jones
 Tom Kuhnhackl
 Alex Nedeljkovic
 Jamie Oleksiak
 Brendan Perlini
 Alex Pietrangelo
 Brett Ritchie
 Jason Robertson
 Andrew Shaw
 Jeremy Smith
 Ryan Strome
 Jack Studnicka
 Philip Tomasino
 Carter Verhaeghe
 Mark Visentin

First round NHL draft picks
List of first round NHL draft picks:

 2008 – Alex Pietrangelo, 1st round (4th overall) St. Louis
 2010 – Mark Visentin, 1st round (27th overall) Phoenix
 2011 – Ryan Strome, 1st round (5th overall) New York Islanders
 2011 – Dougie Hamilton, 1st round (9th overall) Boston
 2014 – Brendan Perlini, 1st round (12th overall) Arizona
 2019 – Philip Tomasino, 1st round (24th overall) Nashville

Award winners

Ontario Hockey League

Bobby Smith Trophy
Scholastic Player of the Year
2010–11 – Dougie Hamilton
Dave Pinkney Trophy
Lowest Team G.A.A.
2011–12 – Mark Visentin  & Christopher Festarini
Eddie Powers Memorial Trophy
Top Scorer in OHL
2018–19 – Jason Robertson 

Ivan Tennant Memorial Award
Top High School Academic Player
2007–08 – Alex Friesen
2008–09 – Freddie Hamilton
2009–10 – Dougie Hamilton
2014–15 – Stephen Dhillon
Leo Lalonde Memorial Trophy
Overage Player of the Year
2007–08 – Michael Swift
2011–12 – Andrew Agozzino

Max Kaminsky Trophy
Most Outstanding Defenceman 
2011–12 – Dougie Hamilton
Mickey Renaud Captain's Trophy
Captain of the Year 
2011–12 – Andrew Agozzino
OHL Executive of the Year
2007–08 – Denise Burke
OHL Goaltender of the Year
2010–11 – Mark Visentin

Canadian Hockey League

CHL Defenceman of the Year
2011–12 – Dougie Hamilton

CHL Scholastic Player of the Year
2010–11 – Dougie Hamilton

CHL Top Scorer Award
2018–19 – Jason Robertson

Season-by-season results

Regular season
Legend: OTL = Overtime loss, SL = Shootout loss

Playoffs

Uniforms and logos
The IceDogs colours are red, black and white. The home jersey is black with red, black and white sleeves with two crossed dog bones on each shoulder. The away jersey is white with red, black and white sleeves with two crossed dog bones on each shoulder. The Niagara logo is a Bull Terrier (modelled after former team part-owner Don Cherry's famous dog, "Blue") playing hockey in hockey gear.  The team wears red and black CCM gloves and CCM helmets (black or white, depending upon their jersey colour).

Arenas

Meridian Centre
The IceDogs moved into the Meridian Centre on October 16, 2014. Located at 1 David S. Howes Way in St. Catharines, the Meridian Centre features a combination of 5,300 permanent and retractable seats.

Jack Gatecliff Arena
The Garden City Arena Complex (formerly known as the Gatorade Garden City Complex, Garden City Arena and the Jack Gatecliff Arena) is a publicly owned and operated facility in St. Catharines. It is located at 8 Gale Crescent and features two ice surfaces (the Rex Stimers Arena and the Jack Gatecliff Arena). The IceDogs played in the Jack Gatecliff Arena of the complex for 7 seasons. The arena's capacity is 3,145 including standing room, making it smaller than most CHL arenas.  With an ice surface of 190 x 85 feet, its dimensions are also smaller than the typical CHL ice surface. It is commonly referred to by fans as 'the Jack'.

The original arena was built in 1932 and became the oldest arena currently used in the CHL following the Windsor Spitfires move to the WFCU Centre in 2008–09.  It was previously used by the St. Catharines Teepees, St. Catharines Black Hawks, St. Catharines Fincups and the St. Catharines Saints. Renovated in 1996, it was named after local sportswriter Jack Gatecliff.

Niagara Falls Memorial Arena
On March 1, 2009, the Niagara IceDogs hosted a home game at Niagara Falls Memorial Arena in nearby Niagara Falls, Ontario.  The arena, slated to close in 2010, was the former home to both the Niagara Falls Flyers and the Niagara Falls Thunder.  The game was billed as the last OHL game in the arena.  The announced crowd of 3,167 was the largest home crowd in franchise history.

See also
List of ice hockey teams in Ontario

References

External links
 

Sport in St. Catharines
Ontario Hockey League teams
Ice hockey clubs established in 2007
2007 establishments in Ontario